Zams is a municipality in the district of Landeck in the Austrian state of Tyrol.

Geography
The Inn River runs through Zams, which is situated in the river's basin together with its neighbour town Landeck. Here, the old roads coming from Vinschgau, Engadin, Bavaria, and Lake Constance cross. At the bridge over the Inn, tolls were demanded from trade wagons as early as the Middle Ages. The municipality comprises two villages, Zams and the much smaller Zammerberg.

Local places
Zams: Lötz, Rease, Oberdorf, Engere, Oberreit, Unterreit, Siedlung, Riefe

Zammerberg: Falterschein, Grist, Kronburg, Lahnbach, Rifenal, Schwaighof, Tatschhof, Anreit

Ausserfern: Madau

Neighbour municipalities
Bach, Fließ, Flirsch, Gramais, Grins, Imst, Kaisers, Landeck, Schönwies, Stanz bei Landeck, Strengen, Wenns

History
Zams has been populated since pre-Christian times, though the first known use of the name (as "Zamis") is from 1150. While Zams has often enjoyed prosperity due to its location, it has also suffered disasters. In 1406 and 1703, Zams was sacked and partially burned. In 1584 and 1635, plague came to Zams, and a plague cemetery was created on the site of the hospital. In 1763, fire destroyed 42 houses and damaged the church tower. In 1911, another fire burned half the village to ash and destroyed much of the old man-made structures, leaving 54 families homeless. The tower remained, and the church was established about fifty meters away. The free-standing church tower is a notable feature of the town.

In 1812 the Merciful Sisters of St. Vincent de Paul established a hospital in Zams, their first in Austria.

The castle at Kronburg was built in 1380 and reconstructed after changing owners in 1504. It fell into disrepair and has been saved only through conservation efforts since the 1830s.

Population

Personalities
 Günther Platter (born 1954), mayor of Zams for 11 years, then advisor for culture and sports in Tirol. From 2003 to 2007 Platter was Austrian minister of defense and from 2007 to 2008 Austrian minister of the interior.  As of July 1, 2008, he is Governor (Landeshauptmann) of Tyrol.
 Nikolaus Schuler (born 1756 in Fließ), founder of the monastery in Zams 
 Johann Josef Netzer (born 1808 in Zams, died 1864), composer
 Franz Xaver Hauser (1924-1999), academic painter and sculptor, originally from Zammerberg
 Romed Mungenast (1953-2006), Yeniche writer
 Anna Zita Maria Stricker (born 1994), professional cyclist
 Mario Matt (born 1979), slalom skier, 2014 Olympic slalom champion
 Andreas Matt (born 1982), ski-cross racer, 2010 Olympic silver medallist
 Michael Matt (born 1993), slalom skier, 2018 Olympic bronze medallist
 Benjamin Parth (born 1988), award-winning chef
 Hansjörg Auer (1984–2019), mountaineer

Economics
While most other places in the Landeck district are shaped by tourism (especially winter tourism), in Zams handicraft, trade, and other services are major activities. About 5% of the population still practice agriculture, usually for supplementary income, particularly near Zammerberg.

See also 
 Landeck-Zams railway station
 European walking route E5
 Via Claudia Augusta
 Via Alpina

References

External links 

 Zams Tourism information
 Zammer Lochputz
 Venet Cablecar
 Alpine Safety and Information Centre

Lechtal Alps
Cities and towns in Landeck District